Berit Berthelsen ( Tøien, 25 April 1944 – 13 February 2022) was a Norwegian athlete. She represented IL Tyrving, as well as her national team.

Biography
Berthelsen dominated long jump and sprints events in the Nordic countries during the 1960s. At the Nordic Championships in 1965 she won five gold medals (100 m, 200 m, 400 m, long jump and relay). She won the European Indoor Games in long jump in 1967 and 1968, and won a European Championships bronze medal in 1969. She finished seventh at the 1964 Summer Olympics and ninth at the 1968 Summer Olympics. In 1968 she also competed in pentathlon, finishing eighteenth.

Throughout her career she won 35 national championships in individual events, and set 29 national records. Her long jump record of 6.56 metres was set on 10 September 1968 and stood for almost 41 years until Margrethe Renstrøm broke it on 1 August 2009, with a 6.64 m jump.

Born in Norway, Berthelsen was educated at the Norwegian School of Sport Sciences. She died on 13 February 2022, at the age of 77.

Achievements

References

External links 
 
 

1944 births
2022 deaths
Norwegian female long jumpers
Norwegian female sprinters
Norwegian pentathletes
Athletes (track and field) at the 1964 Summer Olympics
Athletes (track and field) at the 1968 Summer Olympics
Olympic athletes of Norway
Sportspeople from Bærum
Norwegian School of Sport Sciences alumni
European Athletics Championships medalists
20th-century Norwegian women